An election to Donegal County Council took place on Wednesday 26 May 1920 as part of that year's Irish local elections. 45 councillors were elected from 10 electoral divisions by PR-STV voting for a five-year term of office.

Sinn Féin won a majority of the seats, and won majorities in 6 of the 10 voting areas.

The vote was largely characterised by poor turnout, with less than 50% of the electorate voting. Buncrana, Letterkenny, and Milford saw particularly poor turnout. At one station in Rathmullan only 3 of the areas 140 voters turned out. Donegal Town saw better turnout.

The total number of invalid votes for the county stood at 9,193.

At the first sitting of the new council, on Friday 18 June, the council voted to recognise the First Dáil.

Following the election Peter J. Ward (Sinn Fein) was elected Chairman. Thomas McFadden (Unionist) was elected Vice-Chairman.

Results by party

Results by Electoral Area

Buncrana

Donegal

Glenties

Letterkenny

Milford

District results

Donegal Town

Dunfanaghy

Dunkineely

Laghey

Letterkenny Rural

Mountcharles

Rathmullan

References

1920 Irish local elections
1920